Leila Hoteit, (ليلى حطيط) a Lebanese woman, a specialist in human capital topics, a managing director, and a senior partner in Boston Consulting Group in Dubai. She is the global lead of Boston Consulting Group's education, employment, and welfare sector. She leads the education and human capital development work in the Middle East.

Personal life 
Hoteit grew up in Lebanon with her parents and sister. Her mother was a pilot and director of operation of the Lebanese Airlines.

At the age 18, Hoteit was one of the few women that traveled abroad to continue her studies. Her father was supportive and encouraged her to pursue her studies despite of her society and culture norms that did not accept working women.

Living in a society where it is not common for women to seek higher education and have successful jobs, Hoteit has faced criticism saying that she is too dedicated to her work, that she is not giving her family the proper attention, and that women belong only to their home after having kids.

Therefore, she gave a speech on the importance of women empowerment and how women should work on lifting each other up instead of seeking the spotlight alone. She believes that women can succeed with the help of other women without the dependency on men.

Education 
Hoteit is a French educated student. She graduated high school in 1992 with a French Baccalaureate in Lebanon. Leila then continued her Bachelor studies in London, United Kingdom, in the Imperial College, where she majored in Electrical and Computer Engineering followed by a PhD in Communication and Signal Processing. Hoteit later earned a Master's Degree in Business Administration in 2002 at INSEAD, France.

Career 
Hoteit started her career in the United Kingdom in 1999 as a senior research scientist in the Schlumberger Cambridge Research. She developed an approach in Borehole Telemetry that contributed to 30% reduction in telemetry downtime. She then continued working at the Cambridge research centre in 2001 as Program Manager. She led a team of six research scientists and developed strong external network of expertise with universities ( Oxford, Imperial College and Cambridge) and helped in the development of strategic planning for long term technology developments in the field of Drilling Interpretation and Control.

Later on, she worked for Oilfield Services in Paris, France in 2003 where she introduced new technologies and services for Open Hole Wireline and managed its business development.

In 2006, Hoteit was a senior associate in Booz& Company at Abu Dhabi, UAE. She participated in various strategy development projects related to operating model design, Financial modeling, transformation programs, and implementation programs. In her projects, Hoteit helped in the organization transformation for  Regional Oil And Gas Co. Company but also developed a socio economic impact assessment in Abu Dhabi Saadiyat Cultural District.

Hoteit then became a senior member of Booz & Company in 2009.She was positioned around the Human Capital Agenda Responsible for winning and delivering over $10M worth of projects annually.

In 2013, she was the partner and vice president of Booz and Company and responsible for the Human Capital development platform. She worked for a GCC Country and wanted to increase national's participation and employment in strategic sectors of the economy.  Hoteit also lead a project for a GCC Country looking at possibilities to increase national employment for females in the creative and digital industries.

Working in the Boston Consulting Group (BCG) since 2014, Hoteit focuses on developing education in the Middle East, for primary and secondary students. She is the globe leader for the employment and Welfare practices in BCG. Hoteit works for Human Capital development and improvement of employment and culture. She is  also a member of the Public Service Practice with over 20 years of strategy and operations experience acquired through projects in the Middle East and Europe.

As being a woman of experience and expert in policy development, strategic planning and organizational development, Hoteit shared her thoughts on women empowerment.

She has written multiple publications about women empowerment and is often a requested expert by the media on topics of education and women’s economic empowerment.

Publications and lectures 
She had many publications and gave lectures that revolved around women and student empowerment and education development. Some of her works are the following:

 “Empowering The Third Billion: Women and the World of Work 2012”.
 “A Decade of Opportunity: The Coming Expansion of the Private Schools Market in the GCC”.
 “Education for Employment – Committing Enterprises to Education Development in the MENA region”.
 “Listening to Students’ Voices Putting Students at the Heart of Education Reform in the GCC”.
  "The Future of Technology Education,How Governments Can Help Bridge the 21st Century Skills Gap" The Boston Consulting Group, World Government Summit.
 "Women on the Move". The Boston Consulting Group.
 Panelist in Women in the World on “Reinvent the rules”, New York, 2018.
 Keynote speaker, SME Advisor, “Is the Future Female? Gender Parity in the World of Tomorrow”, Dubai, 2017.
 TED talk"3 lessons on success from an Arab businesswoman."

Honors and awards 
Hoteit worked as a senior research scientist at Schlumberger Cambridge research center from January 1999 till February 2001, and received an inventor award for  improving borehole telemetry downtime. 
Hoteit was awarded the Global Teacher Prize by Varkey Foundation in May 2015 for being an exceptional teacher for her outstanding performance in teaching and inspiring her students.
She was also chosen as a  Young Global Leader in 2014 for her work on human capital development by the World Economic Forum. Hoteit was also selected as an expert member in the UNESCO Inclusive Policy Lab in 2019. Later in 2020, she was recognized by Forbes Middle East as one of the top Power Businesswomen.

References 

1974 births
Living people
Lebanese women in business